Steven Francis Frey (born July 29, 1963) is an American former professional baseball pitcher, who played in Major League Baseball (MLB) for the Montreal Expos, California Angels, San Francisco Giants, Seattle Mariners, and Philadelphia Phillies, from 1989 through 1996.

Frey attended William Tennent High School in Warminster, Pennsylvania, and played three seasons of college ball at Bucks County Community College before being drafted by the New York Yankees in the fifteenth round (379th overall) of the 1983 Major League Baseball draft.

Path to the majors
Frey spent five seasons in the Yankees' farm system, getting as high as triple A Columbus. On December 11, he was traded with catcher Phil Lombardi and Darren Reed to the New York Mets for Rafael Santana and Victor Garcia. After one season with the Tidewater Tides, he was traded to the Montreal Expos for Mark Bailey and Tom O'Malley. He made his major league debut with the Expos on May 10, pitching the final inning of the Expos' 10-1 victory over the Houston Astros in the Astrodome.

California Angels
After three seasons in Montreal, Frey was purchased by the California Angels in Spring training . It was with the Angels that Frey enjoyed his greatest success. In , Frey went 2-3 with a 2.98 earned run average and a team leading thirteen saves.

1994-1996
Frey did not perform as well in San Francisco, going 1-0 with a 4.94 ERA and no saves in 1994. He was sent to the Seattle Mariners during the  season, then released by the Mariners after only thirteen appearances. He signed with the Philadelphia Phillies for the remainder of the season, and pitched well for them down the stretch, pitching 10.2 innings and only giving up one earned run.

Post-Career
Frey now serves as a coach/counselor at the IMG baseball academy in Bradenton, Florida. He has been a coach there since 2004.

References

External links

1963 births
Living people
Albany-Colonie Yankees players
American expatriate baseball players in Canada
Baseball players from Pennsylvania
California Angels players
Columbus Clippers players
Fort Lauderdale Yankees players
Indianapolis Indians players
Major League Baseball pitchers
Montreal Expos players
Oklahoma RedHawks players
Oneonta Yankees players
Pawtucket Red Sox players
Philadelphia Phillies players
San Francisco Giants players
Scranton/Wilkes-Barre Red Barons players
Seattle Mariners players
Tidewater Tides players
Vancouver Canadians players